Three scripts are currently used for the Tatar language: Arabic (in China), Cyrillic (in Russia and Kazakhstan) and Latin (Poland, Tatars of Turkey, Finland, the Czech Republic, Poland, the USA and Australia use the Tatar Latin alphabet at present).

History of Tatar writing

Before 1928, the Tatar language was usually written using alphabets based on the Arabic alphabet: İske imlâ alphabet before 1920 and Yaña imlâ alphabet in 1920–1927. Some letters such as چ and پ were borrowed from the Persian alphabet and the letter ﯓ (called nef or sağır kef) was borrowed from Chagatai. The writing system was inherited from Volga Bulgar.

The most ancient of Tatar literature (Qíssai Yosıf by Qol-Ğäli, written in Old Tatar language) was created in the beginning of the 13th century. Until 1905 all literature was in Old Tatar, which was partly derived from the Bolgar language and not intelligible with modern Tatar. Since 1905 newspaper publishers started using modern Tatar. In 1918 the Arabic-based alphabet was revised: some new letters for Tatar sounds were added and some Arabic letters deleted. The Latin-based Jaꞑalif alphabet was in use between 1928 and 1939 and the Cyrillic-based alphabet has been used ever since.

Some scholars regard Institutiones linguae Turcicae libri quator ("The Basic Rules of the Turkic Language"), written in Latin by Hieronymus Megiser and printed in Leipzig in 1612, being the first example of a Turkic text printed in Arabic script, as a first printed Tatar book. Meanwhile Hieronymus Megiser’s Chorographia Tartariae published in 1611 describes a unique Tartarian alphabet and cites the Lord’s Prayer in the Tartarian language, written in Latin script. The first Turkic-Tatar printed publication in Russia appears to be Peter the Great's Manifest, printed in Arabic script and published in Astrakhan in 1722.

Printed books appeared en masse in 1801 when the first private typography ("Oriental typography") in Kazan appeared.

The first unsuccessful attempt to publish a Tatar newspaper was in 1808, when professor of mathematics at Kazan University, I.I. Zapolsky, proposed publishing a newspaper "The Kazan News" in both Russian and Tatar languages. Zapolsky's untimely death in 1810 thwarted the project. The first successful attempt to publish a newspaper in Tatar was in 1905. On September 2, the first issue of the newspaper "Nur" was published in St. Petersburg by Gataulla Bayazitov. The second Tatar newspaper, "Kazan Muhbire," came into existence on October 29, 1905. The publisher of the newspaper was a member of the Kazan City Council, Saidgirey Alkin.

The first Tatar typewriter was created in Tatarstan in the 1920s and used the Arabic-based alphabet.

In 1930s Turkey became a potential enemy of the Soviet Union. Even though Turkish alphabet, introduced in 1928, was different from Jaꞑalif, for Soviet officials the Latin script was a symbol of the Western world. This motivated switching all Turkic languages of the USSR to Cyrillic script.

This was not the first project of introducing Cyrillic script for the Tatar language. This alphabet is related to the Mari alphabet, and was used because Christian Tatars couldn't use the Arabic script. By the 1930s, Ilminsky's alphabet was forgotten and could not be used due to its religious origin. In 1938 professor M. Fazlullin introduced an adaptation of the Russian alphabet for the Tatar language, without any additional characters. Tatar sounds absent from Russian were to be represented with the digraphs Жь, Нь, Хь, Аь, Уь, Оь, Ый.

In 1939 Qorbangaliev and Ramazanov offered their own projects that planned to use additional Cyrillic characters. In Ramazanov's project  (Jaꞑalif ⟨v⟩) was spelled as ⟨в⟩ before a vowel, and as ⟨у⟩ or ⟨ү⟩ in the end of a syllable. On 5 May 1939, Presidium of the Supreme Soviet of Tatar ASSR issued the decree "On switching Tatar writing from the Latin-based alphabet to an alphabet based on Russian glyphs", which opened with a declaration that the switch was enacted "in response to numerous requests by Tatar workers, kolkhozniks, and intelligentsia." The Tatar society disagreed to this project, and during a conference in July 1940, the Cyrillic alphabet was amended. The updated alphabet was accepted on 10 January 1941.

When ⟨га/го/гу/гы/ка/ко/ку/кы⟩ is followed by a "soft syllable", containing one of the front vowels ⟨ә, е, ө, и, ү⟩ or the soft sign ⟨ь⟩, they are pronounced as [ʁæ/ʁɵ/ʁy/ʁe/qæ/qɵ/qy/qe], otherwise as [ʁɑ/ʁo/ʁu/ʁɤ/qɑ/qo/qu/qɤ]. ⟨гә/гө/гү/ге/кә/кө/кү/ке⟩ are pronounced as [ɡæ/ɡɵ/ɡy/ɡe/kæ/kɵ/ky/ke]. Similar rules apply to ⟨е, ю, я⟩ which could be pronounced as either [je, jy, jæ] or [jɤ, ju, jɑ]. The soft sign is not used to show palatalization as in Russian, but to show qualities of vowels where they are not determinable through vowel harmony. Unlike modern Russian, some words can end with ⟨гъ⟩, representing   after a front vowel, as in ⟨балигъ⟩ [bɑliʁ] ("baligh"). In total, the Tatar Cyrillic script requires the Russian alphabet plus 6 extra letters: Әә, Өө, Үү, Җҗ, Ңң, Һһ. All Russian loanwords are written as in Russian and should be pronounced with Russian pronunciation.

The complexity of the orthographic rules had led to discussions about amending the Tatar Cyrillic alphabet again; these included sessions in the Kazan branch of the Academy of Sciences of the Soviet Union (KFAN) which were conducted in January 1954 and in February–March 1959, but did not result in any specific proposal for a new alphabet. In 1972, prof. On 18 May 1989, the Orthographic Commission formed by the KFAN published the new alphabet, which included Baskakov's three new letters, and the new spelling rules. The new alphabetic order was as follows, with the new letters shown in brackets:

 А Ә Б В [Ў] Г [Ғ] Д Е (Ё) Ж Җ З И Й К [Қ] Л М Н Ң О Ө П Р С Т У Ү Ф Х Һ Ц Ч Ш Щ Ъ Ы Ь Э Ю Я

The spelling system of 1940 had led to many homographs and near-homographs between Tatar and Russian which had totally different pronunciation, e.g. ⟨гарь⟩ [ʁær] "shame" and ⟨гарь⟩ [ɡarʲ] "cinder". This presented difficulties for pupils learning the two spelling systems for the two languages simultaneously. One of the goals for the new spelling system was that the same sequence of letters would correspond to the same sounds, whether in a Russian word or in a Tatar word. Yet, the amended orthography was never formally adopted, as the popular opinion in the 1990s leaned towards switching to a Latin-based alphabet, instead of changing the Cyrillic one. Thus, on 20 July 1994, the Supreme Council of the Republic of Tatarstan approved a gradual transition to Latin-based script; the urgency of such transition was included in the resolution of the Second World Congress of the Tatars in 1997. Recognizing the popular demand, on 15 September 1999, the State Council of the Republic of Tatarstan issued the decree "On restoring the Tatar alphabet based on Latin glyphs". Despite the name of the decree, the new Latin alphabet was significantly different from Jaꞑalif, and its letters had one-to-one correspondence with the proposed Cyrillic alphabet from 1989. On 27 September 2000, the Cabinet of Ministers updated the new Latin alphabet, replacing the three uncommon characters inherited from Jaꞑalif (Ə, Ɵ, Ꞑ) with those present in Latin-1 encoding and in most computer fonts.

Correspondence between alphabets

Before the 1980s, in the listing of the alphabet, extra letters were placed after the Russian ones, as shown above. The Tatar Parliament changed the alphabetic order in January 1997 to the one shown below.

Cyrillic version 
The official Cyrillic version of the Tatar alphabet used in Tatarstan contains 39 letters:

А Ә Б В Г Д Е (Ё) Ж Җ З И Й К Л М Н Ң О Ө П Р С Т У Ү Ф Х Һ Ц Ч Ш Щ Ъ Ы Ь Э Ю Я

Letter names and pronunciation 

Due to the Russian Federal law, only Cyrillic alphabets may have official status in regions of the Russian Federation. There is ongoing confrontation with regards to adoption of the Latin script for the Tatar language.

Latin version 
According to the decree "On restoring the Tatar alphabet based on Latin glyphs" from 1999, the new Latin alphabet would be in official use alongside the Cyrillic alphabet from 1 September 2001, and would become the sole alphabet in official use by 1 September 2011. Around the same time, the Republic of Karelia was pursuing official status for Karelian language, which also uses a Latin-based alphabet. The Russian State Duma perceived the latinization of the two republics as a variety of language secessionism, and on 15 November 2002, they introduced an amendment into the law On the languages of the peoples of the Russian Federation stating that all official languages of the republics within the Russian Federation must use Cyrillic alphabets.

The Republic of Tatarstan challenged the amendment in the Constitutional Court of Russia, arguing that the State Duma doesn't have authority over the language policies of the constituent republics. On 16 November 2004, the Constitutional Court declined the appeal. To comply with the court's decision, the decree "On restoring the Tatar alphabet based on Latin glyphs" was officially rescinded on 22 January 2005.

On 24 December 2012, a new Tatarstani law clarified that the new Latin alphabet, as specified in 2000, should be used as the official romanization for the Tatar language. It also specified Yaña imlâ as the official system for transliteration into the Arabic script. According to this law, requests to Tatarstani authorities may use the Latin and Arabic scripts, but the authorities' answers would be written in Cyrillic, with an optional transliteration into the other alphabets. As of 2020, Cyrillic remains the only official script in Tatarstan.

Zamanälif (Tatar for "modern alphabet") contains 34 letters. There are 10 vowels and 25 consonants. In addition to the ISO basic Latin alphabet, the following 9 letters are used: Çç, Ğğ, Şş, Ññ, Ää, Öö, Üü, Iı, İi.

A, Ä, B, C, Ç, D, E, F, G, Ğ, H, I, İ, J, K, L, M, N, Ñ, O, Ö, P, Q, R, S, Ş, T, U, Ü, V, W, X, Y, Z.

Tatar vowels are: a/ä, o/ö, u/ü, ıy/i, ı/e.

The symbol  is used for the glottal stop (known as hämzä in Tatar).

Tatar writing is largely phonetic, meaning that the pronunciation of a word can usually be derived from its spelling. This rule excludes recent loanwords, such as summit and names.

Letter names and pronunciation

Perso-Arabic version

Sample of the scripts
Article 1 of the Universal Declaration of Human Rights:

See also
Tatar language

References

External links
Information about Tatar writing
Lengua Tártara
Tatar Cyrillic-Latin text and website converter

Tatar language
Latin alphabets
Alphabets used by Turkic languages
Cyrillic alphabets